This is a list of lists of philosophers, organized by subarea, nationality, religion, and time period.

Lists of philosophers by subfield
 List of aestheticians
 List of critical theorists
 List of environmental philosophers
 List of epistemologists
 List of ethicists
 List of existentialists
 List of feminist philosophers
 List of humanists
 List of logicians
 List of metaphysicians
 List of social and political philosophers
 List of phenomenologists
 List of philosophers of language
 List of philosophers of mind
 List of philosophers of religion
 List of philosophers of science
 List of political philosophers
 List of political theorists
 List of rationalists
 List of utilitarians

Lists of philosophers by language or nationality
 List of Afghan philosophers
 List of American philosophers
 List of Jewish American philosophers
 List of Armenian philosophers
 List of Basque philosophers
 List of British philosophers
 List of Canadian philosophers
 List of Chinese philosophers
 List of Finnish philosophers
 List of French philosophers
 List of German-language philosophers
 List of Icelandic philosophers
 List of Indian philosophers
 List of Iranian philosophers
 List of Italian philosophers
 List of Korean philosophers
 List of Kurdish philosophers
 List of Lithuanian philosophers
 List of Romanian philosophers
 List of Russian philosophers
 List of Slovene philosophers
 List of Turkish philosophers

Lists of philosophers by religion
 List of atheist philosophers
 List of Buddhist philosophers
 List of Catholic philosophers and theologians
 List of Muslim philosophers

Lists of philosophers by name
 List of philosophers (A–C)
 List of philosophers (D–H)
 List of philosophers (I–Q)
 List of philosophers (R–Z)

Lists of philosophers by time period
 List of ancient Greek philosophers
 List of ancient Platonists
 List of Cynic philosophers
 List of Epicurean philosophers
 List of Stoic philosophers
 List of scholastic philosophers

Lists of philosophers by century
 List of philosophers born in the centuries BC
 List of philosophers born in the 1st through 10th centuries
 List of philosophers born in the 11th through 14th centuries
 List of philosophers born in the 15th and 16th centuries
 List of philosophers born in the 17th century
 List of philosophers born in the 18th century
 List of philosophers born in the 19th century
 List of philosophers born in the 20th century

Timelines 
 Timeline of Eastern philosophers
 Timeline of Western philosophers

Miscellaneous 
 List of women philosophers
 List of nicknames of philosophers
 Deaths of philosophers